Tyler Lewis Graham (born January 25, 1984) is an American former professional baseball outfielder and current coach. He played in Major League Baseball (MLB) for the Arizona Diamondbacks.

Career
Graham went to Charles M. Russell High School in Great Falls, Montana. He attended Oregon State University, where he played college baseball for the Oregon State Beavers baseball team, competing in the Pacific-10 Conference. Graham was drafted by the Chicago Cubs in the 14th round (430th overall) of the 2005 Major League Baseball Draft following his junior season at Oregon State, but he opted not to sign, returning to Oregon State for his senior season.

In 2006, Oregon State won the College World Series, and Graham made the final out in center field on a fly ball to close out the deciding game three. The Giants drafted Graham in the 19th round (566th overall) of the 2006 Major League Baseball Draft following his senior season, and he signed.

With the Fresno Grizzlies of the Triple-A Pacific Coast League, Graham set a team record with 60 stolen bases in 2011. The Giants added him to the 40 man roster to protect him from the Rule 5 draft after the 2011 season.

He was designated for assignment by the Giants on May 1, 2012, and he signed a minor league contract with the Arizona Diamondbacks on May 14. He made his major league debut with the Diamondbacks on September 7, 2012.

On November 3, Graham was released by the Diamondbacks. He had shoulder surgery at the end of the month, but came back in time to start the season with the York Revolution of the Atlantic League.

In 2013, Graham played for York, the Fargo-Moorhead RedHawks and the Winnipeg Goldeyes of the American Association, and the Rojos del Águila de Veracruz of the Mexican League. Graham spent the final season of his playing career in the San Francisco Giants organization.

Coaching career
Graham spent the 2015 and 2016 seasons as an undergrad assistant for the Oregon State Beaver baseball team. He spent 2017 through 2019 as the director of player development for Oregon State. Graham also coached in the Western Canadian Baseball League for the Okotoks Dawgs and in the Golden State Collegiate Baseball League for the Medford Rogues.

Graham was hired by the Texas Rangers organization to serve as a coach for the Nashville Sounds in 2020.

References

External links

Oregon State Beavers coach bio

1984 births
Living people
American expatriate baseball players in Canada
American expatriate baseball players in Mexico
Arizona Diamondbacks players
Arizona League Diamondbacks players
Augusta GreenJackets players
Baseball coaches from Montana
Baseball players from Montana
Bravos de Margarita players
Connecticut Defenders players
Fargo-Moorhead RedHawks players
Fresno Grizzlies players
Leones del Caracas players
American expatriate baseball players in Venezuela
Major League Baseball center fielders
Major League Baseball right fielders
Mexican League baseball center fielders
Mexican League baseball left fielders
Minor league baseball coaches
Oregon State Beavers baseball coaches
Oregon State Beavers baseball players
Oregon State University alumni
Sportspeople from Great Falls, Montana
Reno Aces players
Richmond Flying Squirrels players
Rojos del Águila de Veracruz players
Salem-Keizer Volcanoes players
San Jose Giants players
Tomateros de Culiacán players
Winnipeg Goldeyes players
York Revolution players
Michigan Wolverines baseball coaches